Algiers is the capital of Algeria.

Algiers may also refer to:

 Algiers Province, Algeria

Algerian history
 Kingdom of Tlemcen was occasionally also called the Kingdom of Algiers
 Regency of Algiers, a state in North Africa
 Bombardment of Algiers (disambiguation), multiple bombardments of Algiers throughout history
 Invasion of Algiers in 1830, the event which ended the Regency of Algiers
 Battle of Algiers (1956–1957), a battle between the FLN and France

Places in the United States 
Algiers, Indiana, an unincorporated community
Algiers, New Orleans, Louisiana, a neighborhood
Algiers Point, a location on the Mississippi River in New Orleans
Algiers, Vermont, an unincorporated community

Other
 Algiers (Algiers album), a 2015 album by the band Algiers
 Algiers (Calexico album), a 2012 album by Calexico, released in 2012
 Algiers (band), an American band formed in Atlanta, Georgia
 Algiers (film), a 1938 American drama film
 Algiers Hotel, a hotel
 El Djazaïr, an Arabic-language newspaper

See also
 
 
 Algeria (disambiguation)
 Alger (disambiguation)
 Argiers, a piece of music on Mike Oldfield's 1976 compilation album, Boxed